Ali Khamis Isa (born 9 August 1986) is a Bahraini handball player for Ettifaq Handball and the Bahraini national team.

He participated at the 2017 World Men's Handball Championship.

References

1986 births
Living people
Bahraini male handball players
21st-century Bahraini people